Chris Prentice (born 4 May 1953) is a British luger. He competed in the men's singles event at the 1984 Winter Olympics.

References

External links
 

1953 births
Living people
British male lugers
Olympic lugers of Great Britain
Lugers at the 1984 Winter Olympics
Sportspeople from London